Andrius is a Lithuanian masculine given name. It is a cognate of the English language name Andrew. People with the name Andrius include:
Andrius Algirdaitis (c.1325–1399), Duke of Pskov and Polotsk 
Andrius Arlauskas (born 1986), Lithuanian footballer  
Andrius Baltuška (born 1971), Lithuanian physicist
Andrius Gedgaudas (born 1978), Lithuanian footballer
Andrius Giedraitis (born 1973), Lithuanian basketball player
Andrius Gudžius (born 1991), Lithuanian discus thrower 
Audrius Kšanavičius (born 1977), Lithuanian footballer
Andrius Kubilius (born 1956), Lithuanian politician, former Prime Minister of Lithuania
Andrius Mamontovas (born 1967), Lithuanian rock musician, songwriter, actor and record producer
Andrius Mažutis (born 1981), Lithuanian basketball player
Andrius Pojavis, (born 1983), Lithuanian pop singer and singer-songwriter
Andrius Puotkalis (born 1980), Lithuanian footballer
Andrius Šidlauskas (footballer) (born 1984), Lithuanian footballer
Andrius Šidlauskas (swimmer) (born 1997), Lithuanian swimmer
Andrius Skerla (born 1977), Lithuanian footballer
Andrius Šležas (born 1975), Lithuanian basketball player
Andrius Tapinas (born 1977), Lithuanian science fiction writer and television presenter
Andrius Upstas (born 1969), Lithuanian footballer
Andrius Velička (born 1979), Lithuanian footballer
Audrius Žuta (born 1969), Lithuanian footballer

References

Lithuanian masculine given names